EvoBus GmbH is a German bus and coach manufacturer headquartered in Stuttgart, Germany and a wholly owned subsidiary of Daimler Truck AG. Its products go to market under the brands Setra or Mercedes-Benz.

History
In 1995, the bus division of Daimler-Benz AG and bus manufacturer Karl Kässbohrer Fahrzeugwerke GmbH amalgamated under the umbrella of EvoBus. Mercedes-Benz brought in more than 100 years of experience in the bus and coach industry, starting with the invention of the omnibus by Karl Benz in 1895 in Mannheim.

EvoBus is headquartered in Stuttgart in Germany, with its largest bus factory in Mannheim in Germany. Licensed buses are also manufactured in Turkey. The city buses, for instance the Citaro, are manufactured in Mannheim, as are the chassis (meaning the frame plus the "running gear" like engine, transmission, driveshaft, differential, and suspension). A body (sometimes referred to as "coachwork"), is built on the chassis to complete the coaches in Ulm/Neu-Ulm, where the final assembly takes place. Other factories of EvoBus are in Ligny-en-Barrois in France and in Sámano in Spain.

Its product portfolio include:
 Bus-specific service ranging from insurance and consulting to concepts for financing and the procurement of original parts and accessories. 
 Sales network for new and used vehicles in Europe, 
 Service network

In 2016, EvoBus had a workforce of 17,899 employees.

Innovations
In April 1951, Setra introduced a coach with self-supporting structure.

By 1955 the company demonstrated a  coach with the first independent air suspension at the German Motor Show in Frankfurt.

Since the 1990s, EvoBus has been experimenting with hydrogen fuel cells to use hydrogen as a primary source of power for the locomotion of buses.

See also

 Daimler AG
 Mercedes-Benz buses
 Setra
 Seida

References

 Article in Industry Europe

External links
 Official company website
 Mercedes-Benz Buses
 Mercedes-Benz Turkey
 Mercedes-Benz Argentina
 Setra website
 Setra USA
 EvoBus South-East Europe & Central Asia
 EvoBus France

Bus manufacturers of Germany
Daimler Truck
Companies established in 1995